Other Robert Ivor Windsor-Clive, 3rd Earl of Plymouth (9 October 1923 – 7 March 2018) was a British landowner, soldier, and business man, a member of the House of Lords from 1943 until 1999.

Born in 1923, the son of Ivor Windsor-Clive, 2nd Earl of Plymouth, Other Windsor-Clive was educated at Eton College. His unusual first name goes back in the Windsor family to Other, or Othoere, the father of Walter Fitz Other, who was castellan of Windsor in the time of William the Conqueror.

He left school in 1941 and was commissioned into the Coldstream Guards, serving throughout the Second World War until 1945. On 1 October 1943, he succeeded as Earl of Plymouth, Viscount Windsor of St Fagans, and Lord Windsor, but was then too young to take his seat in the House of Lords. He took part in the Normandy landings on D-Day, 6 June 1944, and rose to Temporary Captain. After the war, he continued his interrupted education at Trinity College, Cambridge, and graduated BA.

In 1953, Plymouth was appointed as a Fellow of the Royal Society of Arts and also as a Knight of the Most Venerable Order of the Hospital of St John of Jerusalem. 

From  1960 to 1967 he was a Trustee of the National Gallery and in 1961 was appointed as a Deputy Lieutenant of Shropshire. From 1967 to 1972, he was President of the National Museum Wales and from 1972 to 1982 sat on the Standing Commission on Museums and Galleries. He was Chairman of the Reviewing Committee for Works of Art between 1982 and 1985.

On 11 October 1950 Plymouth married Caroline Helen Rice, and they had four children:
Ivor Windsor-Clive, Viscount Windsor
Lady Emma Windsor-Clive
Simon Windsor-Clive
David Windsor-Clive 

In 1999, Plymouth was one of the hereditary peers who ceased to be members of the House of Lords as a result of the House of Lords Act 1999. In more than fifty years as a member, he is not recorded in Hansard as having spoken.

On his death in March 2018 he was succeeded by his oldest son, now the fourth Earl of Plymouth.

Notes

1923 births
2018 deaths
Alumni of Trinity College, Cambridge
Coldstream Guards officers
Deputy Lieutenants of Shropshire
Earls in the Peerage of the United Kingdom
Other Robert Ivor
Knights of the Order of Saint John (chartered 1888)
People educated at Eton College
Plymouth